Lisbeth Korsmo (14 January 1948 – 22 January 2017) was a Norwegian speed skater, cyclist, and Olympic medalist. She received a bronze medal at the 1976 Winter Olympics in Innsbruck. She also won the Norwegian National Road Race Championship in 1981. She died on 22 January 2017 at the age of 69.

References

External links 
 

1948 births
2017 deaths
Norwegian female speed skaters
Norwegian female cyclists
Olympic speed skaters of Norway
Speed skaters at the 1976 Winter Olympics
Olympic bronze medalists for Norway
Olympic medalists in speed skating
Medalists at the 1976 Winter Olympics
Sportspeople from Oslo
20th-century Norwegian women